Ireland competed at the 2006 European Athletics Championships held in Sweden. Derval O'Rourke's silver medal, combined with a new national record, in the 100 metre hurdles was the highlight of the championship, which also saw a new women's 4 × 100 m relay national record and a national record equalling performance from Deirdre Ryan in the high jump.

Results

Results by event

Men's competition

Men's 200 m
 Paul Brizzell
 Round 1 — 20.84 
 Round 2 — DNF
 Paul Hession
 Round 1 — 20.81 
 Round 2 — 20.80
 Semi-Final — 21.09 (did not advance)
 Gary Ryan
 Round 1 — 21.14 (did not advance)

Men's 400 m
 Paul "Junior" McKee
 Round 1 — 46.48 (did not advance)
 David Gillick
 Round 1 — 46.16
 Semi-Final — 46.84 (did not advance)
 David McCarthy
 Round 1 — 46.53 (did not advance)

Men's 800 m
 David Campbell
 Round 1 — 01:48.70 (did not advance)
 Thomas Chamney
 Round 1 — 01:50.12 (did not advance)

Men's 1,500 m
 James Nolan
 Semi-Final — 03:49.94 (did not advance)
 Liam Reale
 Semi-Final — 03:41.97
 Final — 03:42.65 (8th place)

Men's 5,000 m
 Alistair Cragg
 Semi-Final — 13:50.12 
 Final — DNF

Men's 10,000 m
 Martin Fagan
 Round 1 — 28:54.04 (11th place)

Men's 4 × 400 m
 Paul McKee, Brian Doyle, David Gillick, David McCarthy
 Semi-Final — 03:04.59 
 Final — 03:05.57 (9th place)

Women's competition

Women's 100 m
 Anna Boyle
 Round 1 — 11.60 (did not advance)
 Emily Maher
 Round 1 — DNS

Women's 200 m
 Anna Boyle
 Round 1 — 23.94 (did not advance)
 Ciara Sheehy
 Round 1 — DNF

Women's 400 m
 Joanne Cuddihy
 Round 1 — 51.41
 Semi-Final — 51.09 (PB)
 Final — 51.46 (8th place)

Women's 1,500 m
 Aoife Byrne
 Semi-Final — 4:16.07 (did not advance)

Women's 5,000 m
 Mary Cullen
 Final — 15:25.80 (PB) (12th Place)
 Marie Davenport
 Final — DNF

Women's 10,000 m
 Marie Davenport
 Final — 33:05.48 (22nd place)

Women's 100 m Hurdles
 Derval O'Rourke
 Round 1 — 13.03 
 Semi final — 12.94
 Final — 12.72 NR (2nd - Silver medal)

Women's 3000 m Steeplechase
 Roísín McGettigan
 Semi-Final — 09:47.31 (did not advance)
 Fionnuala Britton
 Semi-Final — 09:49.20 (PB) (did not advance)

Women's 4 × 100 m
 Derval O'Rourke, Joanne Cuddihy, Ailis McSweeney and Anna Boyle 
 Semi-Final — 44.38  (NR) (did not advance)

Women's High Jump
 Deirdre Ryan
 Qualifying — 1.92 m (=NR)
 Final — 1.84 m (13th place)

Women's Hammer Throw
 Eileen O'Keefe
 Qualifying — 65.07 m (did not advance)

Competitors

References

Ireland
2006
European Athletics Championships